CG, Cg or cg may refer to:

Arts and entertainment 
 Chaotic Good, an alignment in the role-playing game Dungeons & Dragons
 Classical guitar, a type of guitar

Businesses and organizations

Businesses
Central of Georgia Railway, between Macon and Savannah, Georgia in the US
Chappe et Gessalin, a French automobile maker
Chaudhary Group, a multinational company based in Nepal
Cigna, formed in Hartford in 1865 as the Connecticut General Life Insurance Company
Colorado General Hospital, now known as University of Colorado Hospital
PNG Air, an airline from Papua New Guinea (IATA code CG)
The Carlyle Group, a private equity firm (stock symbol CG)

Military units
Ceremonial Guard, an ad hoc military unit in the Canadian Forces
Coast guard, a national organization responsible for various services at sea

Political parties
Galician Coalition, a Galician political party with a Galician nationalist and centrist ideology
Galician Convergence, a Galician political party with a moderate nationalist ideology, which describes itself as centrist, socially progressive and economically liberal

Other organizations
Common Ground (NYC), a non-profit that builds and runs supportive housing in New York City and elsewhere
Community Games, an Irish voluntary organisation for young people to experience sporting and cultural activities

Mathematics, science, and technology

Mathematics and computing
Cg (programming language), developed by NVIDIA
Categorial grammar, a term used for a family of formalisms in natural language syntax
Character generator, a device or software that produces static or animated text (such as crawls and rolls) for keying into a video stream for broadcast television
Computational geometry, the study of algorithms to solve problems stated in terms of geometry
Computer graphics, graphics created using computers and, more generally, the representation and manipulation of image data by a computer with help from specialized software and hardware
Computer-generated imagery, application of computer graphics to create or contribute to images in art
Conceptual graph, a formalism for knowledge representation
Conjugate gradient method, an algorithm for the numerical solution of particular systems of linear equations
Constraint Grammar, a methodological paradigm for natural language processing
Coherency Granule, usually the size of a CPU cache line 
Clock gating, a way to lower clock tree power in an integrated circuit

Other uses in science and technology
Centigram (cg), a unit of mass in the SI system
Center of gravity, a point in a body that may be used to simplify description of gravitational interactions
Cloud-to-ground lightning, a type of lightning
Carbon group, also called group 14
Chorionic gonadotropin, a hormone produced by the placenta during pregnancy
Guided-missile cruiser (US Navy hull classification symbol CG)
Phosgene (military designation CG), a chemical weapon used during World War I

Places
Chhattisgarh, a state of India
Crna Gora, Montenegro
Democratic Republic of the Congo (FIPS Pub 10-4 and obsolete NATO digram)
Republic of the Congo (ISO country code), a state in Central Africa
.cg, the Internet country code top-level domain (ccTLD) for the Republic of the Congo
Cypress Gardens, an American theme park near Winter Haven, Florida, that operated from 1936 to 2009

Ranks and titles
Certified Genealogist, licensed by the Board for Certification of Genealogists
Commandant-General, a rank in several counties and is generally equivalent to that of Commandant
Commanding General, a commanding officer in the military that holds a general officer rank

Other uses
Complete game, in baseball, the act of a pitcher pitching an entire game without the benefit of a relief pitcher
Corporate Governance, a system of law and approaches by which corporations are directed and controlled

See also